Mariya Didi, is a Maldivian barrister and politician.

Didi received her Bachelor’s degree in Law and Master’s degree in Law from the University of Aberystwyth, Wales, United Kingdom and became the first woman lawyer in the Maldives. 

Didi is the Minister of Defence of the Republic of Maldives. After being the campaign manager for president Ibrahim Mohamed Solih during the elections 2018 she was appointed the nation’s first-ever female Minister of Defence.

Mariya Didi, in her capacity as Minister of Defence, oversees a total of 8 critical institutions, namely Maldives National Defence Force (MNDF), National Counter Terrorism Center (NCTC), National Disaster Management Authority (NDMA), Maldives Customs Service, Maldives Immigration, Aviation Security Command (AVSECOM), Anti-Trafficking in Persons (Anti-TIP) Office and Maldives Hydrographic Service.

See also 
 First women lawyers around the world

References 

1962 births
Living people
Maldivian activists
Maldivian Democratic Party politicians
Maldivian lawyers
Maldivian women's rights activists
21st-century Maldivian women politicians
21st-century Maldivian politicians
Female defence ministers
Recipients of the International Women of Courage Award
Women government ministers of the Maldives
Defense ministers of the Maldives